Acacia marramamba, commonly known as marramamba, is a shrub or tree belonging to the genus Acacia and the subgenus Phyllodineae that is endemic to arid parts of western Australia.

Description
It has grey coloured bark that is mostly smooth but becomes fissured and fibrous near the base of the tree. Like most species of Acacia it has phyllodes rather than true leaves. It produces red and yellow flowers from May to July.

Taxonomy
The species was first formally described by the botanist Bruce Maslin in 1982 as part of the work Studies in the genus Acacia (Leguminosae: Mimosoideae). Acacia species of the Hamersley Range area, Western Australia as published in the journal Nuytsia. It was reclassified as Racosperma marramamba by Leslie Pedley in 2003 then transferred back to genus Acacia in 2006.
The specific epithet is derived from the area where it is found in the Pilbara in the Marra Mamba Iron Formation.

Distribution
It is native to an area in the Gascoyne, Pilbara and Goldfields regions of Western Australia where it is often situated on rocky hillslopes growing in gravelly and stony skeletal soils often over or around ironstone. It has a scattered distribution with the bulk of the population in the Pilbara from around Duck Creek Station in the north west to Balfour Downs Station to the north east it is also found in the Barlee Range and upper catchments of the Gascoyne, Ashburton and Murchison Rivers and down to around Mount Fraser in the south. It does not form dense populations it is generally not uncommon throughout its range. It is usually a part of open woodland communities dominated by Eucalyptus leucophloia or tall open shrubland communities where it is associated with Acacia aneura , Acacia sibirica and Acacia maitlandii with a spinifex understorey.

See also
List of Acacia species

References

marramamba
Acacias of Western Australia
Taxa named by Bruce Maslin
Plants described in 1982